Deng Tuo (c. 1911 – 17 May 1966), also known by the pen name Ma Nancun, was a Chinese poet, intellectual and journalist. He became a cadre of the Communist Party of China and served as editor-in-chief of the People's Daily from 1948 to 1958. He committed suicide in 1966 following scathing criticism in the People's Daily, as the Cultural Revolution was beginning.

Bibliography 
 Timothy Cheek, Propaganda and Culture in Mao's China: Deng Tuo and the Intelligentsia, Oxford University Press, 1998  
 Roderick MacFarquhar: The origins of the cultural revolution, Oxford University Press

References

1910s births
1966 suicides
Republic of China poets
Suicides during the Cultural Revolution
People's Republic of China poets
Writers from Fuzhou
Poets from Fujian
Republic of China essayists
People's Republic of China essayists
People's Daily people
20th-century essayists
Year of birth uncertain
Date of birth missing
Place of birth missing
Place of death missing